The 2007 Turkish motorcycle Grand Prix was the third round of the 2007 MotoGP championship. It took place on the weekend of 20–22 April 2007 at the Istanbul Park circuit.

MotoGP classification

250cc classification

125cc classification

Championship standings after the race (MotoGP)

Below are the standings for the top five riders and constructors after round three has concluded. 

Riders' Championship standings

Constructors' Championship standings

 Note: Only the top five positions are included for both sets of standings.

References

Turkish motorcycle Grand Prix
Turkish
Motorcycle
April 2007 sports events in Turkey